Zoya Agarwal is an Indian commercial pilot who has flown for Air India. In 2021, Agarwal captained an all-woman crew making the inaugural flight from San Francisco to Bengaluru, one of the longest non-stop air routes in the world.

Career 
In 2006, The Times of India highlighted Agarwal as a rising female aviator of India. She became the youngest woman pilot in India to fly a Boeing-777 in 2013. Agarwal garnered attention for her role in saving a passenger's life on a flight bound to New York in 2015. After a passenger complained of breathlessness, she decided to turn back the flight and land at Indira Gandhi International Airport, Delhi, where the passenger was taken to a nearby hospital.

As a precautionary measure during the COVID-19 pandemic, the Government of India initiated Vande Bharat Mission in May 2020 to evacuate around 14,800 Indians from twelve countries on sixty-four Air India flights. Agarwal was chosen to co-pilot the first repatriation flight by the airline.

In 2021, Agarwal captained an all-woman crew making the inaugural flight from San Francisco to Bengaluru, one of the longest non-stop air routes in the world. Later that month, the crew made an appearance on Indian Idol for its Republic Day special episode. Later that year, Agarwal was chosen by the United Nations as its spokesperson for Generation Equality.

In August 2022, Zoya got inducted into a prominent US-based aviation museum - Louis a. turpen aviation museum. The SFO based aviation museum recognised Zoya Agarwal's illustrious career in aviation and her passion for empowering women worldwide. She has motivated millions of young women and girls to achieve their ambitions.

With copilots R Someshwar, Sandeep Mukhedkar and Abhay Agarwal, Zoya Agarwal piloted Air India's first Boeing 777 aircraft over the Hindu Kush mountain range. The route cut flight time of one of Delhi's most popular non-stop routes to North America, compared to a route taken since Afghan airspace was closed to non-defence aircraft in August. The airline previously began flying its Boeing 787s over the Hindu Kush mountain range in October.

References 

Indian women aviators
Indian women commercial aviators
Air India
Living people
Year of birth missing (living people)